Alessandro Di Renzo (born 22 September 2000) is an Italian professional footballer who plays as a left back for  club Monterosi.

Club career
Formed on Pescara and Ternana youth system, Di Renzo made his senior debut for Francavilla in 2018–19 Serie D season.

On 28 June 2021, he joined new Serie C club Ancona-Matelica.

On 18 July 2022, Di Renzo signed with Monterosi.

References

External links
 
 

2000 births
Living people
Sportspeople from Pescara
Footballers from Abruzzo
Italian footballers
Association football fullbacks
Serie C players
Serie D players
Delfino Pescara 1936 players
S.S. Chieti Calcio players
Ternana Calcio players
A.S.D. Francavilla players
S.S. Matelica Calcio 1921 players
Ancona-Matelica players
Monterosi Tuscia F.C. players